Oviri (Tahitian for savage or wild) is an 1894 ceramic sculpture by the French artist Paul Gauguin. In Tahitian mythology, Oviri was the goddess of mourning and is shown with long pale hair and wild eyes, smothering a wolf with her feet while clutching a cub in her arms. Art historians have presented multiple interpretations—usually that Gauguin intended it as an epithet to reinforce his self-image as a "civilised savage". Tahitian goddesses of her era had passed from folk memory by 1894, yet Gauguin romanticises the island's past as he reaches towards more ancient sources, including an Assyrian relief of a "master of animals" type, and Majapahit mummies. Other possible influences include preserved skulls from the Marquesas Islands, figures found at Borobudur, and a 9th-century Mahayana Buddhist temple in central Java.

Gauguin made three casts, each in partially glazed stoneware, and while several copies exist in plaster or bronze, the original cast is in the Musée d'Orsay.  His sales of the casts were not successful, and at a low financial and personal ebb he asked for one to be placed on his grave. There are only three other surviving comments of his on the figure: he described the figure as a strange and cruel enigma on an 1895 presentation mount of two impressions of a woodcut of Oviri for Stéphane Mallarmé; he referred to it as La Tueuse ("The Murderess") in an 1897 letter to Ambroise Vollard; and he appended an inscription referencing Honoré de Balzac's novel Séraphîta in a  drawing. Oviri was exhibited at the 1906 Salon d'Automne (no. 57) where it influenced Pablo Picasso, who based one of the figures in Les Demoiselles d'Avignon on it.

Background
Gauguin was foremost a painter; he came to ceramics around 1886, when he was taught by the French sculptor and ceramist Ernest Chaplet. They had been introduced by Félix Bracquemond who, inspired by the new French art pottery, was experimenting with the form. During that winter of 1886–87, Gauguin visited Chaplet's workshop at Vaugirard, where they collaborated on stoneware pots with applied figures or ornamental fragments and multiple handles.

Gauguin first visited Tahiti in 1891 and, attracted by the beauty of Tahitian women, undertook a set of sculptural mask-like portraits on paper. They evoke both melancholy and death, and conjure the state of faaturuma (brooding or melancholy); imagery and moods later used in the Oviri ceramic. Gauguin's first wood carvings in Tahiti were with a guava wood that quickly crumbled and have not survived.

He completed Oviri in the winter of 1894, during his return from Tahiti, and submitted it to the Société Nationale des Beaux-Arts 1895 salon opening in April the following year. There are two versions of what ensued:  claimed in 1920 that Gauguin was "literally expelled" from the exhibition; in 1937 Ambroise Vollard wrote that the piece was admitted only when Chaplet threatened to withdraw his own works in protest. According to Bengt Danielsson, Gauguin was keen to increase his public exposure and availed of this opportunity by writing an outraged letter to Le Soir, bemoaning the state of modern ceramics.

At the outset of 1897, Vollard addressed a letter to Gauguin about the possibility of casting his sculptures in bronze. Gauguin's response centred on Oviri:
I believe that my large statue in ceramic, the Tueuse ("The Murderess"), is an exceptional piece such as no ceramist has made until now and that, in addition, it would look very well cast in bronze (without retouching and without patina). In this way the buyer would not only have the ceramic piece itself, but also a bronze edition with which to make money.

Art historian Christopher Gray mentions three plaster casts, the fissured surfaces of which suggest that they were taken from a prior undocumented wood carving no longer extant. One was given to Daniel Monfreid and now belongs to the Musée départemental Maurice Denis "The Priory" in Saint-Germain-en-Laye. Another version in plaster, with the surface finish of wood, was kept by Gustave Fayet, and subsequently formed part of the collection of his son, Léon. The third version was kept by the artist who made the casts.

Description and sources

Oviri has long blonde or grey hair reaching to her knees. Her head and eyes are disproportionately large, while the aperture at the back of her head resembles a vaginal orifice. She holds a wolf cub to her hip, a symbol of her indifference and wild power. It is not clear whether Oviri is smothering or hugging the cub, but her pose invokes ideas of sacrifice, infanticide and the archetype of the vengeful mother, influenced by Eugène Delacroix's 1838 painting, Medea About to Kill Her Children. A second animal, likely another wolf, is at her feet either curling in submission or dead. Art historians including Sue Taylor suggest the second animal may represent Gauguin.

The association between the woman and a wolf stems from a remark Edgar Degas made defending Gauguin's work at the poorly received  1893 Durand-Ruel exhibition, when Degas quoted La Fontaine's fable The Dog and the Wolf, which is usually taken as implying that freedom should not be exchanged for comfort or financial gain: "You see, Gauguin is the wolf." In Oviri, the mature wolf, the European Gauguin, perishes while the whelp, the  Gauguin of Tahiti, survives.

The Tahitian myths had largely disappeared by Gauguin's time (he based his own accounts on other sources without acknowledgement), as had most artefacts associated with that culture. His representation of Oviri is largely a work of imagination, informed by a collection of what he described as his "little world of friends" and which he took with him to Tahiti on his first visit. These included Odilon Redon's lithograph La Mort, photographs of subjects such as a temple frieze at Borobudur, Java, and an Egyptian fresco from an 18th dynasty tomb at Thebes. Other sources that have been suggested include an Assyrian relief of Gilgamesh clutching a lion cub now in the Louvre, and a Majapahit terracotta figure from the Djakarta museum.

Oviri's head seems based on mummified skulls of chieftains in the Marquesas Islands, whose eye sockets were traditionally encrusted with mother-of-pearl and worshiped as divine. Elements of her body may draw from  Borobudur images of fecundity. Thus life and death were evoked in the same image. In a letter to Mallarmé trying to raise a public subscription to purchase the work, Morice titled the sculpture Diane Chasseresse ("Diana the Huntress"), an allusion to the ancient Greek goddess Diana of the hunt, moon and childbirth. He made the same reference in his poems on Oviri. Barbara Landy interprets the life and death theme as indicating Gauguin's need to abandon his civilised ego in a return to the natural state of the primitive savage. The work is related to the 1889 ceramic Black Venus, which shows a woman kneeling over a severed head resembling the artist.

Nancy Mowll Mathews believes the creatures in her arms and at her feet are actually foxes, animals Gauguin had used in his 1889 wood carving Be in Love, You Will Be Happy and in his 1891 Pont-Aven oil painting The Loss of Virginity. In an 1889 letter to Émile Bernard, he described the Soyez amoureuses fox as an "Indian symbol of perversity". There is a long tradition in Asian folklore of foxes having the power to transform into women (for example in Japanese Yōkai or Kitsune folklore).

Gauguin depicts the Oviri figure in at least one drawing, two watercolour transfer monotypes and two woodcuts. It is possible that the woodcuts were created in Pont-Aven in the summer of 1894; before the ceramic. The last to appear is probably the drawing in what is apparently the first issue of Gauguin's Papeete broadsheet Le Sourire "(The Smile: A Serious Newspaper)" published between August 1899 and April 1900. It was accompanied by the inscription "Et le monstre, entraînant sa créature, féconde de sa semence des flancs généreux pour engendrer Séraphitus-Séraphita" (And the monster, embracing its creation, filled her generous womb with seed and fathered Séraphitus-Séraphita). Séraphitus-Séraphita is an allusion to Honoré de Balzac's novel Séraphîta which features an androgynous hero. In this first issue of Le Sourire, he reviewed a local Maohi author's play by that dealt with incest (among other themes), and invokes 'Séraphitus-Séraphita'. The review congratulated the play's "savage author" and ended with a plea for women's liberation through the abolition of marriage. The accompanying drawing is distinctly androgynous.

Interpretation
Art historians have put forward various theories as to the seeming multiplicity of meanings inherent in Gauguin's representation. Most obviously the figure invokes Tahitian legend and themes of death and superstition. It reflects the artist's view of female sexuality; a common motif in 19th century art was the connection between long, wild hair and evil femininity. Related is the delight Gauguin took from its alternative title "savage" and the implications of a brutal, bloodthirsty deity, which seems to refer as much to himself as the goddess.

Tahiti deity

Gauguin's figure invokes the Polynesian goddess Hina, depicted by Morice as a Diana-like deity clutching a wolf cub, "monstrous and majestic, drunk with pride, rage and sorrow". He titled an 1894 self-portrait in plaster as Oviri. The original is lost but a number of bronze casts survive. He used double mirrors to capture his familiar Inca profile, the result reprising his Jug in the Form of a Head, Self-Portrait. This was one of the earliest occasions Gauguin applied the term Oviri to himself. "Gauguin sometimes also referred to himself as Oviri, the savage ...", writes . The Stuttgart version of his 1892 oil painting E haere oe i hia (Where Are You Going?) depicts a woman clutching a wolf cub. Pollitt remarks that this stocky, sculptural and androgynous figure gives a first glimpse of Oviri.

Oviri was the title of a favourite Tahitian song—a melancholy tune of love and longing that mentions the subject's "savage, restless heart". It recounts the love between two women for each other, both of whom have grown silent and cold. Gauguin translated the verse in his series of romanticised journal Noa Noa (Tahitian for "fragrance", a written project he undertook to examine his Tahitian experience, which he accompanied with a series of ten woodcuts); the only one of his songs reprinted in the Tahitian newspaper La Guêpes when he became editor. Danielsson believes the song echoes Gauguin's dual attachment to his Danish wife Mette and his then vahine (Tahitian for "woman") Teha'amana, his young native wife and the focal point of Noa Noa.

Noa Noa contains an account of a journey into the mountains with a young man whom he eventually understands as sexless, leading him to meditate on the "androgynous side of the savage" in his manuscript. Ben Pollitt notes that in Tahitian culture the craftsman/artist, neither warrior/hunter nor homemaker/carer, was conceived androgynously, an ambiguous gender position that appealed to Gauguin's subversive nature. Taylor believes Morice may have been describing Gauguin in his 1897 poem Shining Hina of the Woods as part of two long extracts from their collaboration on Noa Noa. Gray views the sculpture as representing "the expression of Gauguin's profound disillusionment and discouragement".

Noa Noa is part of Gauguin's documentation of his experiences as a colonial visitor to Tahiti in 1891–1893. He first used the term "Noa Noa" to describe the scent of Tahitian women: "A mingled perfume, half animal, half vegetable emanated from them; the perfume of their blood and of the gardenia taitensis, which they wore in their hair". On his return to Paris in 1893, Gauguin was apprehensive about exhibiting his Tahitian works. Noa Noa was to provide the context necessary for the public to comprehend the new motifs presented at his Durand-Ruel exhibition. It was not completed in time for the opening of the exhibition.

Self portrait
Gauguin asked that Oviri be placed on his grave, which seems to indicate that he saw the figure as his alter ego. According to Mathews, he saw the fox as changeable in its gender as he was, and thus symbolic of dangerous sexuality. A number of sources indicate that Gauguin was suffering a syphilitic rash that prevented him from travelling to Tahiti for several months. She suggests the orifice is a pars pro toto for the woman who infected him.

The anthropologist  believes Oviri was intended as an epithet to reinforce Gauguin's persona as a "civilised savage".  In his final letter to Morice, the artist wrote that "You were wrong that day when you said I was wrong to say I was a savage. It's true enough: I am a savage. And civilised people sense the fact. In my work there is nothing that can surprise or disconcert, except the fact that I am a savage in spite of myself. That's also why my work is inimitable."

Reception and influence

Whether or not the sculpture was to be exhibited at the Salon de la Nationale, it was scheduled for the café proprietor Lévy at 57 rue Saint-Lazare, with whom Gauguin had concluded an agreement to represent him before his last departure for Tahiti. It failed to sell, and Charles Morice was unable to raise public money to acquire it for the nation. Gauguin had thought his only likely interested patron would be Gustave Fayet, who did eventually buy it for 1,500 francs, but in 1905, after Gauguin's death.

Gauguin was celebrated by the Parisian avant-garde after the posthumous retrospective exhibitions at the Salon d'Automne in 1903 and 1906. The power evoked by his work led directly to Les Demoiselles d'Avignon in 1907. According to David Sweetman, Picasso became an aficionado of Gauguin in 1902 when he befriended the expatriate Spanish sculptor and ceramist Paco Durrio in Paris. Durrio was a friend of Gauguin and held several of his works in an attempt to help his poverty-stricken friend in Tahiti by promoting his oeuvre in Paris.

Art historian John Richardson writes:
The 1906 exhibition of Gauguin's work left Picasso more than ever in this artist's thrall. Gauguin demonstrated the most disparate types of art—not to speak of elements from metaphysics, ethnology, symbolism, the Bible, classical myths, and much else besides—could be combined into a synthesis that was of its time yet timeless. An artist could also confound conventional notions of beauty, he demonstrated, by harnessing his demons to the dark gods (not necessarily Tahitian ones) and tapping a new source of divine energy.

Both Sweetman and Richardson point to the Gauguin Oviri as a major influence. First exhibited in the 1906 Salon d'Automne retrospective, it was probably a direct influence on Les Demoiselles. David Sweetman writes, "Gauguin's statue Oviri, which was prominently displayed in 1906, was to stimulate Picasso's interest in both sculpture and ceramics, while the woodcuts would reinforce his interest in printmaking, though it was the element of the primitive in all of them which most conditioned the direction that Picasso's art would take. This interest would culminate in the seminal Les Demoiselles d'Avignon."

In 2006, a bronze version of Oviri sold at Christie's New York for US$251,200.

Recent exhibitions

 Tokyo, Seibu Department Store; Kyoto, Musée National d'Art Moderne, and Fukuoka, Centre Culturel, Gauguin, August 1969, no. 110
 Munich, Haus der Kunst, Weltkulturen und Moderne Kunst, XX Olympics, July–August 1972, no. 1726
 The Colour of sculpture 1840–1910, Henry Moore Institute, Leeds, 1996
 Gauguin Tahiti, Paris, 2003
 Gauguin Tahiti, Museum of Fine Arts, Boston, 2004
 Chefs-d'oeuvre du musée d'Orsay pour le 150e anniversaire de la galerie Tretyakov, Tretyakov Gallery, Moscow, 2006
 Cézanne to Picasso, Ambroise Vollard, Patron of the Avant-Garde, Metropolitan Museum of Art, New York, 2006
 Cézanne to Picasso, Ambroise Vollard, Patron of the Avant-Garde, Art Institute of Chicago, 2007
 Gauguin, Maker of Myth. Tate Modern, London, 2010
 Gauguin, Maker of Myth, National Gallery of Art, Washington D.C., 2011
 Gauguin Polynesia, Ny Carlsberg Glyptotek, Copenhagen, 2011
 Gauguin Polynesia, Seattle Art Museum, Seattle, 2012
 Gauguin, Metamorphosis; MoMA, NYC, 2014
 Paul Gauguin, Fondation Beyeler, Riehen, 2015

Sources

Notes

References

Bibliography

 Barkan, Elazar; Bush, Ronald. Prehistories of the Future: The Primitivist Project and the Culture of Modernism. Stanford, CA: Stanford University Press, 1996. 
 Brooks, Van Wyck. Paul Gauguin's Intimate Journals. New York, NY: Boni and Liveright, 1921
 Brettell, Richard; Zegers, Peter. The Art of Paul Gauguin. Washington, D.C.: National Gallery of Art, 1988. 
 Cachin, Françoise. Gauguin. Paris: Flammarion, 1990. 
 Campbell, Gordon. The Grove Encyclopedia of Decorative Arts, Volume 1. Oxford: Oxford University Press, 1996. 
 Castets, H. Gauguin, Revue universelle, III:xcvi, 15 October 1903, p. 536
 Chipp, Herschel Browning. In: Selz, Peter (ed). Theories of Modern Art. Oakland, CA: University of California Press, 1984. 
 Danielsson, Bengt. Gauguin in the South Seas. New York, NY: Doubleday and Company, 1965
 Eisenman, Stephen. Gauguin's Skirt. London: Thames and Hudson, 1999. 
 Frèches-Thory, Claire; Zegers, Peter. The Art of Paul Gauguin. Washington, D.C.: National Gallery of Art, 1988. 
 Gedo, John. "The Inner World of Paul Gauguin". The Annual of Psychoanalysis, v. 22. London: Routledge, 1994. 
 Gray, Christopher. Sculpture and Ceramics of Paul Gauguin. Baltimore, MD: Johns Hopkins Press, no. 113, 1963
 Ives, Colta. The Great Wave: The Influence of Japanese Woodcuts on French Prints. New York: Bulfinch Press, 1981. 
 Landy, Barbara. "The Meaning of Gauguin's 'Oviri' Ceramic". Burlington Magazine, Volume 109, No. 769, April 1967
 Malingue, Maurice. Paul Gauguin: Letters to his Wife and Friends. Cleveland, OH: MFA Publications, 1949. 
 Mathews, Nancy Mowll. Paul Gauguin, an Erotic Life. New Haven, CT: Yale University Press, 2001. 
 Maurer, Naomi. The Pursuit of Spiritual Wisdom. Madison, NJ: Fairleigh Dickinson University Press, 1998. 
 Morice, Charles. Noa Noa: The Tahiti Journal of Paul Gauguin. San Francisco, CA: Chronicle, 1901. 
 Morice, Charles. Paul Gauguin, Paris, 1919. 158–59
 Nicole, Robert. The Word, the Pen, and the Pistol: Literature and Power in Tahiti. New York: State University of New York Press, 2000. 
 Pielkovo, Ruth. The letters of Paul Gauguin to Georges Daniel de Monfreid. Madison, WS: University of Wisconsin, 1922
 Richardson, John A. A Life Of Picasso, The Cubist Rebel 1907–1916. New York: Alfred A. Knopf, 1991. 
 Schackelford, George. Gauguin, Tahiti. Boston, MA: Museum of Fine Arts, 2004. 
 Solomon-Godeau, Abigail. Going Native, Paul Gauguin and the Invention of the Primitivist Modernist. The Expanding Discourse: Feminism and Art History. Boulder, CO: WestView, 1992
 Sugana, G.M. L'opera completa di Gauguin, p. 111, no. 394-1, Milan, 1972
 Sweetman, David. Paul Gauguin: A life. New York: Simon & Schuster, 1995. 
 Szech, Anna. Paul Gauguin. Stuttgart: Hatje Cantz, 2015. 
 Taylor, Sue. "Oviri: Gauguin's Savage Woman". Journal of Art History, Volume 62, Issue 3/4, 1993
 Thomson, Belinda. Gauguin. London: Thames and Hudson, 1987. 
 van der Grijp, Paul. An Anthropology of the Yearning for Authenticity. Münster: Lit Verlag, 2009. 
 Vollard, A. Souvenirs d'un marchand de tableaux, Paris, 1937, p. 197
 Wadley, N. ed., Noa Noa, Gauguin's Tahiti, p. 124, pl. 79, London, 1985

External links

 Beril Becker, Paul Gauguin, The Calm Madman, Tudor Publishing Co., New York, 1935 (full text)
 Field, Richard S; Philadelphia Museum of Art, Paul Gauguin: Monotypes, 1973, Catalog of the exhibition held at the Philadelphia Museum of Art, March 23-May 13, 1973 (full text)
 The letters of Paul Gauguin to Georges Daniel de Monfreid, translated by Ruth Pielkovo, Forward by Frederick O'Brien, Dodd, Mead and Company, 1922 (full text)

1894 sculptures
Ceramic sculptures
Sculptures of the Musée d'Orsay
Nude art
Paul Gauguin
Sculptures of goddesses